Twin Oaks Community is an ecovillage and intentional community of about one hundred people living on  in Louisa County, Virginia. It is a member of the Federation of Egalitarian Communities.  Founded in 1967, it is one of the longest-enduring and largest secular intentional communities in North America. The community's basic values are cooperation, egalitarianism, nonviolence, sustainability, and income sharing. About 100 adults and 17 children live in the community.

Founding 
The community was founded on a  tobacco farm in 1967 by a group of eight individuals with no farming experience that included Kat Kinkade, who wrote two books about the community. The community's initial inspiration was B. F. Skinner's novel Walden Two, which describes a fictional behaviorist utopia. However, Skinner's vision quickly faded from prominence at Twin Oaks, as behaviorist principles were abandoned in favor of egalitarian principles. The community struggled greatly during its first few years, as member turnover was high and the community members didn't earn much income. According to Kinkade, the community avoided the problems of laziness, freeloading, and excessive lack of structure stereotypically associated with communes by adopting a structured, yet flexible, labor system.

Modified versions of the community's initial organizational structure and labor credit system survive to this day. As in Skinner's novel, the original labor credit system utilized "variable" credit hours. Certain jobs were worth more credit hours than others in order to make each job desirable. What the community found once the population reached about 40 is that there was neither universally desirable work, nor undesirable work and the variable credit hour system created distortions in which work was getting done. The modified version of this plan in place today uses "standardized" credits; each job in the community is valued the same in terms of credit hours.

Life as a member 
Twin Oaks has approximately 100 members. People interested in joining Twin Oaks must attend a scheduled three-week visitor period. During this period, visitors tour the community and attend orientations on various aspects of membership. Unlike most co-housing situations, there is no cost to join the community, nor any rent or ongoing costs associated with living there. Basic necessities—housing, clothing, food, health care—are all provided to members in return for their 42 weekly hours of work. Since 2011, Twin Oaks has consistently had a waiting list, so visitors who are accepted for membership need to wait typically three to nine months before they can join. Before a new member can join, while the community is at its population capacity, a current member needs to drop membership. Historically, Twin Oaks has expanded its housing when it has had a waiting list for a prolonged period by building new residences and expanding the stock of bedrooms available.

A member of Twin Oaks works around 42 hours a week. Some labor is directed toward generating income, and the rest consists of domestic work like gardening/food production, cooking, bike repair, building maintenance, cleaning, and child care. Most Twin Oakers perform a wide variety of tasks each week instead of spending all of their time in one labor area. Members can also choose to work outside of Twin Oaks. The income from this labor may go to the community, although some portion of it can go into a member's "vacation earnings". Excess labor done in a week accumulates as vacation time.

Though live television viewing is prohibited, Twin Oaks' members have access to the Internet as well as to public computers. Members can also watch movies and tapes of TV programs. People in the community often gather for other recreational activities such as dancing, meditating, discussing literature, staging musicals, and playing board games.

Twin Oaks members are religiously diverse. The membership includes Christians, atheists, pagans, Buddhists, and others. The community hosts pagan handfastings, Equinox parties, and Thanksgiving dinners, and it celebrates June 16, the anniversary of its founding.

Residents live in dormitory-style living quarters spread out across the community. Each member has a private bedroom, but shares public spaces.

Member turnover is no longer as high as it was in the community's early years, and many former Twin Oakers live in nearby Charlottesville and Louisa to maintain ties to the community.

The community itself acknowledges that it has yet to create the perfect society; it even provides a guidebook entitled "Not Utopia Yet" to visitors. Those who choose to live at Twin Oaks for several years—including founder Kinkade—sometimes feel "trapped" there. This is because members have little opportunity to build up equity or savings. The BBC Four television series Utopia: In Search of the Dream, broadcast on August 15, 2017, devoted an 11-minute segment to Twin Oaks. Members and one former member (the founders' daughter), interviewed by Professor Richard Clay, expressed concerns about the inability to build savings and complex interpersonal relationships. Clay observed that 20 percent of the membership turned over annually.

Community businesses 
Twin Oaks' 42-hour work week is divided between domestic and income-producing labor. Twin Oaks operates several community-owned businesses, including Twin Oaks Tofu, Twin Oaks Hammocks, and Twin Oaks Book Indexing. Additionally, members working in the Twin Oaks Seed Farm grow seeds for Southern Exposure Seed Exchange. From these sources, Twin Oaks generates around $600,000 per year. This money pays for community upkeep and goods that cannot be produced on site, and each member receives a monthly stipend for personal use (i.e., to purchase items that the community does not provide). In news segments, Twin Oakers often attribute the longevity of the community to its engagement in capitalism through its tofu and hammocks businesses.

Supporting the communities movement  

Twin Oaks also hosts annual intentional community gatherings cosponsored by the Fellowship for Intentional Community: The Communities Conference, and the Women's Gathering, both of which take place every August.

Media coverage  

The history of Twin Oaks Community is detailed extensively in two books by Kathleen (Kat) Kinkade, one of the co-founders of the community. The first, A Walden Two Experiment, covers the first five years of the community. The second, Is it Utopia Yet?, covers the next 20 years. Another book from the 1980s, Living the Dream, by Ingrid Komar (the mother of a member at the time the book was written), also discusses Twin Oaks' history. About half a dozen dissertations and a dozen master's theses have been written about the community, as well. In 1998, the Washington Post Magazine did a cover story on Twin Oaks.

Ecology 

Twin Oaks seeks to be a model of sustainability. The average Twin Oaks member consumes fewer resources than the average American due to the community's practices of resource sharing and self-sufficiency. Members hold all resources in common except for the personal items they keep in their bedrooms. For instance, members share housing, a fleet of 17 vehicles, and a large "clothing library". Twin Oaks members consume 70% less gasoline, 80% less electricity, and 76% less natural gas per capita than do their neighbors.

References

External links

1967 establishments in Virginia
Ecovillages
Egalitarian communities
Intentional communities in the United States
Populated places established in 1967
Rural community development
Unincorporated communities in Louisa County, Virginia
Unincorporated communities in Virginia
Utopian communities in the United States